Esporte Clube Metropol, commonly known as Metropol, were a Brazilian football team from Criciúma, Santa Catarina state. They won the Campeonato Catarinense,  the main competition of association football for the state of Santa Catarina, five times.

History
Esporte Clube Metropol were founded on January 20, 1960. They won the state championship in 1960, 1961, 1962, 1967 and 1969. Metropol closed their professional football department in 1969, shortly after winning the state championship, due to a disagreement with the Santa Catarina State Football Federation. The club then started to compete again in amateur competitions.

Stadium
Metropol played their home games at Estádio Euvaldo Loudi. The stadium had a maximum capacity of 20,000 people.

Achievements

 Campeonato Catarinense:
 Winners (5): 1960, 1961, 1962, 1967, 1969

References

Defunct football clubs in Santa Catarina (state)
Association football clubs established in 1935
Association football clubs disestablished in 1969
1969 disestablishments in Brazil